David Cecil Mills (23 April 1937 – 16 March 2013) was an English cricketer.  Mills was a right-handed batsman who bowled right-arm medium pace.  He was born in Camborne, Cornwall and educated at Clifton College, where he represented the college cricket team.

Mills made his only first-class appearance for Gloucestershire against Cambridge University in 1958.  In his match, he scored 17 runs, before being dismissed by Michael James, in what was his only batting innings for the county.  He later made a further first-class appearance in 1960, this time for the Free Foresters against Cambridge University.  In this match, he once again batted once, scoring 2 runs before being dismissed by David Kirby.

References

External links
David Mills at ESPNcricinfo
David Mills at CricketArchive

1937 births
2013 deaths
People from Camborne
People educated at Clifton College
English cricketers
Gloucestershire cricketers
Free Foresters cricketers